Arrowsmiths is a ghost town in Farmer Township, Defiance County, Ohio, United States.

History
A mill was operated by one Mr. Arrowsmith on Lost Creek until around 1846. A post office called Arrowsmiths was established in 1843, and remained in operation until 1866.

References

Geography of Defiance County, Ohio
Ghost towns in Ohio